Koxanəbi (also, Koxa Nəbi and Këkhanabi) is a village and municipality in the Tovuz Rayon of Azerbaijan.  It has a population of 235.

References 

Populated places in Tovuz District